Onchnesoma is one of the two genera that constitute the family Phascolionidae of Phylum Sipuncula, described by Koren and Danielssen established in 1873 as the type species to Onchnesoma steenstrupii.

Description
The species of this genus are usually small in size (with a trunk of less than 1 cm in length). The introverted is much longer than the trunk. The body wall muscle layers presents continuous. The disc may present oral tentacles (usually less than 10 and about 8 mm. in length) arranged around the mouth, but those tentacles can be reduced in size or completely absent. The retractor muscle system is a highly modified introverted form fused to form a muscle retractor. The anus is located in the distal half of introverted. Gallbladder contractile is rarely observed and if present is without villi. They have a single nephridium.

Species 
 Onchnesoma intermedium Murina, 1976
 Onchnesoma magnibathum Cutler, 1969 
 Onchnesoma squamatum (Koren y Danielssen, 1875)
 Onchnesoma steenstrupii Koren y Danielssen, 1875

References

External links

 World Register of Marine Species (WoRMS) Onchnesoma Koren & Danielssen, 1876  AphiaID: 136024  
 Integrated Taxonomic Information System (ITIS): Onchnesoma  Koren and Danielssen, 1875 Taxonomic Serial No.: 154722

Sipunculans